Syarif Wijianto (born 25 August 1994) is an Indonesian professional footballer who plays as a defender or defensive midfielder for Liga 2 club PSIM Yogyakarta.

Club career

PSIM Yogyakarta
In 2021, Syarif signed a contract with Indonesian Liga 2 club PSIM Yogyakarta. He made his league debut on 26 September 2021 in a match against PSCS Cilacap at the Manahan Stadium, Surakarta.

Persela Lamongan (loan)
He was signed for Persela Lamongan to play in Liga 1 in the 2021 season. Syarif made his league debut on 11 January 2022 in a match against Persita Tangerang at the Ngurah Rai Stadium, Denpasar.

Career statistics

Club

References

External links
 Syarif Wijianto at Soccerway
 Syarif Wijianto at Liga Indonesia

1994 births
Living people
Indonesian footballers
Persita Tangerang players
Persela Lamongan players
Association football defenders
People from Semarang
Sportspeople from Central Java